Yuri Villefort (born March 23, 1991) is a Brazilian mixed martial artist who competes in the Welterweight division. A professional competitor since 2009, he has competed for the UFC and Strikeforce. He is the younger brother of fellow mixed martial artist Danillo Villefort.

Mixed martial arts career

Early career
Yuri started his career in 2009 and fought mainly for Florida-based promotions. With a record of six victories and no losses, Villefort signed with Strikeforce.

Strikeforce
Villefort was expected to face Travis Bush on July 24, 2011 at Strikeforce Challengers 16: Fodor vs. Terry. However, he was removed from the event due to training injuries.

Villefort made his debut against Quinn Mulhern on May 19, 2012 at Strikeforce: Barnett vs. Cormier. He lost via split decision (30–27 Mulhern, 29–28 Villefort, 29–28 Mulhern).

Villefort was expected to face Nah-Shon Burrell on September 29, 2012 at Strikeforce: Melendez vs. Healy. However, the event was cancelled due to headliner and lightweight champion Gilbert Melendez getting injured.

Ultimate Fighting Championship
Villefort made his promotional debut against fellow Strikeforce import Nah-Shon Burrell on February 23, 2013 at UFC 157. He lost the back-and-forth fight via unanimous decision (30–27, 29–28, 29–28).

Villefort faced Sean Spencer on September 4, 2013 at UFC Fight Night: Teixeira vs. Bader. He lost the fight via split decision (30–27 Spencer, 29–28 Villefort, 29–28 Spencer). and was subsequently released from the promotion.

Post-UFC career
Villefort returned to MMA after a one-year hiatus, and faced Chris Bennett at Fight Time 21 on November 7, 2014. Despite being the considerable favorite coming into the fight, Villefort would lose the fight via guillotine choke, just forty-five seconds into the first round.

Mixed martial arts record

|-
|Loss
|align=center|11–7
|João Zeferino
|Decision (unanimous)
|PFL 6 
|
|align=center|3
|align=center|1:10
|Atlantic City, New Jersey, United States
|  
|-
|Loss
|align=center|11–6
|Rick Story
|Decision (unanimous)
|PFL 3 
|
|align=center|3
|align=center|5:00
|Washington, D.C., United States
|  
|-
|Win
|align=center|11–5
|Victor Moreno
|Submission (guillotine choke)
|Victory FC 59
|
|align=center|1
|align=center|0:29
|Omaha, Nebraska, United States
|
|-
|Win
|align=center|10–5
|Kassius Holdorf
|Decision (unanimous)
|Victory FC 56
|
|align=center|5
|align=center|5:00
|Omaha, Nebraska, United States
|
|-
|Win
|align=center|9–5
|Cody Carrillo
|Decision (unanimous)
|Victory FC 50
|
|align=center|3
|align=center|5:00
|Topeka, Kansas, United States
|
|-
|Win
|align=center|8–5
|Kenneth Glenn
|KO (knee)
|Victory FC 47
|
|align=center|1
|align=center|4:15
|Omaha, Nebraska, United States
|
|-
|Win
|align=center|7–5
|Doug Jenkins
|KO (punches)
|Gladiator Cage Fights
|
|align=center|1
|align=center|1:40
|St. Charles, Missouri, United States
|
|-
|Loss
|align=center|6–5
|Adam Townsend
|Decision (unanimous)
|RFA vs. Legacy FC 1: Pantoja vs. Page
|
|align=center|3
|align=center|5:00
|Robinsonville, Mississippi, United States
|
|-
|Loss
|align=center|6–4
|Chris Bennett
|Submission (guillotine choke)
|Fight Time 21: Soares vs. Barroso
|
|align=center|1
|align=center|0:45
|Fort Lauderdale, Florida, United States
|
|-
|Loss
|align=center|6–3
|Sean Spencer
|Decision (split)
|UFC Fight Night: Teixeira vs. Bader
|
|align=center|3
|align=center|5:00
|Belo Horizonte, Minas Gerais, Brazil
|
|-
|Loss
|align=center|6–2
|Nah-Shon Burrell
|Decision (unanimous)
|UFC 157
|
|align=center|3
|align=center|5:00
|Anaheim, California, United States
|
|-
|Loss
|align=center|6–1
|Quinn Mulhern
|Decision (split)
|Strikeforce: Barnett vs. Cormier
|
|align=center|3
|align=center|5:00
|San Jose, California, United States
|
|-
|Win
|align=center|6–0
|Jason Fitzhugh
|Submission (armbar)
|Action Fight League: Rock-N-Rumble 3
|
|align=center|2
|align=center|2:04
|Hollywood, Florida, United States
|
|-
|Win
|align=center|5–0
|Julio César Andrade
|Decision (unanimous)
|Bitetti Combat 6
|
|align=center|3
|align=center|5:00
|Brasília, Distrito Federal, Brazil
|
|-
|Win
|align=center|4–0
|Joshua Lee
|TKO (punches)
|Unconquered 1: November Reign
|
|align=center|2
|align=center|4:08
|Coral Gables, Florida, United States
|
|-
|Win
|align=center|3–0
|Frank Carrillo
|KO (punch)
|G-Force Fights: Bad Blood 2
|
|align=center|1
|align=center|4:03
|Coral Gables, Florida, United States
|
|-
|Win
|align=center|2–0
|Bounmy Somchay
|Submission (guillotine choke)
|XFN: Da Matta vs. Thorne
|
|align=center|1
|align=center|2:22
|Fort Lauderdale, Florida, United States
|
|-
|Win
|align=center|1–0
|Lindon Mitchell
|Submission (heel hook)
|RW 3: Florida
|
|align=center|1
|align=center|0:51
|Fort Lauderdale, Florida, United States
|

References

External links
 
 

1991 births
Living people
Sportspeople from Brasília
Brazilian male mixed martial artists
Welterweight mixed martial artists
Ultimate Fighting Championship male fighters